NPPD may refer to:
 New Product and Process Development
 Nebraska Public Power District
 National Protection and Programs Directorate
 Nitrophenyl pentadienal (5-(4-nitrophenyl)-2,4-pentadienal), colloquially known as 'spydust', a chemical compound used as a tagging agent by the KGB during the Cold War Soviet era